Fortune Z. Charumbira is a politician from Zimbabwe who is serving as President of Pan-African Parliament from 2022 and Zimbabwe Council of Chiefs from 2013. He also served as 4th Vice President of Pan-African Parliament and Deputy Minister of Ministry of Local Government and Public Works of Zimbabwe during 2000s.

References 

Year of birth missing (living people)
Living people
Members of the Pan-African Parliament from Zimbabwe
Members of the Senate of Zimbabwe
Pan-African Parliament
Presidents of Pan-African Parliament